The men's marathon event at the 1930 British Empire Games was held on 21 August in Hamilton, Canada with the start and finish at the Civic Stadium.

Results

References

Athletics at the 1930 British Empire Games
1930